Lorne James Nicolson (July 4, 1936 – February 26, 2021) was a Canadian educator and political figure in British Columbia. He represented Nelson-Creston in the Legislative Assembly of British Columbia from 1972 to 1986 as a New Democratic Party (NDP) member.

He was born in Vancouver, British Columbia, the son of James Thomas Nicolson and Rosa Maria Cristiano, and was educated at the University of British Columbia. In 1958, Nicolson married Frances Golata. He served in the provincial cabinet as a minister without portfolio and as Minister of Housing.

References 

1936 births
Living people
British Columbia New Democratic Party MLAs
Canadian educators
Members of the Executive Council of British Columbia
Politicians from Vancouver
University of British Columbia alumni